is a dam in Yuzawa, Niigata Prefecture, Japan, completed in 1978.

References 

Dams in Niigata Prefecture
Dams completed in 1978